Wyena is a rural locality in the local government areas (LGA) of Dorset and Launceston in the North-east and Launceston LGA regions of Tasmania. The 2016 census recorded a population of 24 for the state suburb of Wyena.

History 
Wyena was gazetted as a locality in 1964. The name is believed to be an Aboriginal word for “small timber”.

Geography
The boundaries consist primarily of survey lines and ridge lines.

Road infrastructure 
Route B81 (Golconda Road) passes through from west to east.

References

Towns in Tasmania
Localities of Dorset Council (Australia)
Localities of City of Launceston